Palazzo Spinola or Spinola Palace may refer to:

Italy

Palazzo Angelo Giovanni Spinola

Palazzo Doria Spinola, Palazzo dei Rolli in the historical center of Genoa, included in the World Heritage Site Genoa: Le Strade Nuove and the system of the Palazzi dei Rolli

Palazzo Doria (Genoa), formerly Palazzo Gio Battista Spinola, Palazzo dei Rolli in the historical center of Genoa, included in the World Heritage Site Genoa: Le Strade Nuove and the system of the Palazzi dei Rolli

Palazzo Pietro Spinola di San Luca

Palazzo Spinola di Pellicceria, Palazzo dei Rolli in the historical center of Genoa, included in the World Heritage Site Genoa: Le Strade Nuove and the system of the Palazzi dei Rolli

Malta
Spinola Palace (St. Julian's)
Spinola Palace (Valletta)